Tisdall is a surname. Notable people with the surname include:

Arthur Walderne St. Clair Tisdall (1890–1915), British recipient of the Victoria Cross
Bob Tisdall (1907–2004), Irish Olympic athlete
Charles Edward Tisdall (1866–1936), Canadian mayor of Vancouver
E.E.P. Tisdall (born 1907), British biographer
Frederick Tisdall (1893–1949), Canadian pediatrician
Jonathan Tisdall (born 1958), chess grandmaster
Margaret Tisdall (1905–1979), Irish singer and pianist known by stage name Peggy Dell
Sarah Tisdall (born 1960), British Foreign Office clerk jailed for leaking documents
William Tisdale (born c. 1570), also spelled Tisdall, English musician and composer
William St. Clair Tisdall (1859–1928), British historian and philologist

See also
Tisdale (disambiguation)